Fath ol Mobin, Fath ol-Mobin or Fath ol Mobīn may refer to
Operation Fath ol-Mobin, a 1982 Iranian military operation of the Iran-Iraq War
Dehnow-e Fath ol Mobin, a village in Iran
Shahrak-e Fath ol Mobin, a village in Iran